Thomas Wisse (November 12, 1949 – August 11, 1995), known professionally as Damon Edge, was an American musician. He was a founding member of the post-punk band Chrome and also recorded as a solo artist.

Biography 
Damon Edge was born in Los Angeles in 1949. He graduated from Inglewood High School in 1967 before attending the California Institute of the Arts. He earned a bachelor's degree in environmental arts in 1970. He started the band Chrome in 1976, taking inspiration from some of his teachers at Cal Arts and from a trip to Europe, where he heard Arabic music for the first time. He produced a lot of the early Chrome cover artwork.

He began working at MGM and jamming with other musicians to create soundtracks for film. After recording the first Chrome album he set up Siren Records to release his own recordings. He moved to San Francisco in the mid 1970s and began recording further Chrome material. In the 1980s he moved to France after marrying Fabienne Shine. They both returned to the U.S. in 1988, living in the Hollywood Hills, but split up in 1990.

Death 
In August 1995 Edge was found dead in his Redondo Beach apartment in California. He had been lying undiscovered for about a month until a neighbor alerted the police. After the breakup with his wife he had begun to drink and smoke heavily. He had recently finished a new solo album in Germany.

Discography (solo albums) 
 Alliance (1985)
 I'm a Gentleman (7") (1985)
 The Wind Is Talking (1985)
 Grand Visions (1986)
 The Surreal Rock (1987)

Footnotes

External links 
Chrome website
Damon Edge website
Damon Edge at Discogs
Damon Edge Bandcamp page

Songwriters from California
1949 births
1995 deaths
Musicians from Redondo Beach, California
20th-century American singers
Singers from California
20th-century American male singers
American male songwriters